Burak Dakak (born 8 June 1998) is a Turkish actor.

Biography
Burak Dakak was born on 8 June 1998 in Ankara. He started his acting career at the age of 10. In 2008, he started playing the role of Servet in Doğruluk Ekseni. In 2009, he appeared as young Mert in Ezel. His other projects were Geniş Aile, Benim Adım Gültepe, Muhteşem Yüzyıl: Kösem, Umuda Kelepçe Vurulmaz and Diriliş: Ertuğrul has appeared in such series. He studied at Bahçeşehir University – Cinema and Theatre School. Between 2019 and 2021, he starred in the TV series Çukur.

Filmography
Television

References

|-

External links

1998 births
Living people
Turkish male television actors
Male actors from Ankara
Bahçeşehir University alumni
21st-century Turkish male actors